This article presents the demographic history of Bulgaria. See Demographics of Bulgaria

31 December 1880 census

31 December 1887 census

31 December 1892 census

31 December 1900 census

31 December 1905 census

31 December 1910 census

31 December 1920 census 

1. During the period 1910 - 1920 Bulgaria suffered physical loss of population as follows:

 About 140,000 died in the wars (Balkan War I, Balkan War II, World War I), mostly of reproductive age;
 About 276,000 people in Southern Dobruja, who cross into Romania, and more on the western outskirts, who cross into Serbia.

2. During the period 1910 - 1920 the population growth in Bulgaria was as follows:

 It is estimated that about 350,000 refugees were sent to Bulgaria, losing territories during the Balkan War ll and the World War I. It is known, however, that a large part of the refugees from the Aegean and Edirne Thrace returned to their native places after the first wave, after which they immigrated to Bulgaria again in 1923;
 Bulgaria includes new suburbs won during the Balkan War I and the World War I - Pirin Macedonia and parts of the Rhodopes and Thrace.

31 December 1926 census

31 December 1934 census

31 December 1946 census 

South Dobruja passes on the territory of Bulgaria.

There are strong indications that in the 1946 census the population was forced to list as ethnic Macedonians against their will by the communist government in accordance with an agreement with Yugoslavia.

1 December 1956 census 

There are strong indications that in the 1956 census the population was forced to list as ethnic Macedonians against their will by the communist government in accordance with an agreement with Yugoslavia.

1 December 1965 census

1 December 1975 census

4 December 1985 census

4 December 1992 census

1 March 2001 census

1 February 2011 census 

The 2011 percentage of the ethnic groups is calculated only from those who answered the optional question on ethnicity (6,680,980 in total) and does not include around 750,000 people who did not answer the question or 10% from the population.

7 September 2021 census

References

External links 

 2011 Bulgaria census site from the National Statistical Institute (Bulgaria)
 2021 Bulgaria census site from the National Statistical Institute (Bulgaria)

Demographics of Bulgaria
Bulgaria